Carrie Smith (born 28 January 1995) is an Australian competitive sailor. She competed at the 2016 Summer Olympics in Rio de Janeiro, in the women's 470 class.

References

External links
 

1995 births
Living people
420 class sailors
470 class sailors
World champions in sailing for Australia
Australian female sailors (sport)
Olympic sailors of Australia
Sailors at the 2016 Summer Olympics – 470
21st-century Australian women